"Everything You've Come to Expect" is the second single by English band The Last Shadow Puppets from their second studio album, Everything You've Come to Expect.  It was released on 10 March 2016 on Domino Records.

Background
The song was one of the last recorded for the album, with Turner mentioning "its the further down the wing we have gone" in terms of the songwiting. Both Turner and Kane have cited Everything You've Come to Expect as their favourite song in the album.

Music video

The music video for "Everything You've Come to Expect" was released on 10 March 2016 and features Turner and Kane submerged in sand up to their necks, with a woman in bridal clothing (Michelle Dawley) scolding Turner and dancing around the beach. It serves as the second installment of the album's video trilogy initiated by Aviation.

The video was shot in one day at Point Dume, Malibu. It was directed by Saam Farahmand and filmed in 16mm. Chung Chung-hoon served as DoP.

Personnel
The Last Shadow Puppets
Alex Turner – vocals, organ
Miles Kane – vocals
James Ford – keyboards, drums, percussion
Zach Dawes – bass guitar

Additional personnel
Owen Pallett – strings arrangement
Matt Helders – vocals

References

2016 singles
2016 songs
The Last Shadow Puppets songs
Songs written by Alex Turner (musician)
Songs written by Miles Kane
Song recordings produced by James Ford (musician)
Domino Recording Company singles